Savage Ridge is named after Michael L. Savage, Dept. of Meteorology, University of Wisconsin, who, along with Charles R. Stearns, developed the use of automatic weather stations in Antarctica during four field seasons, 1980–96.

References

Ridges of Victoria Land
Scott Coast